Isla de los Estados (English: Staten Island, from the Dutch Stateneiland) is an Argentine island that lies  off the eastern extremity of Tierra del Fuego, from which it is separated by the Le Maire Strait. It was named after the Netherlands States-General, the Dutch parliament.

The island is part of the Argentinian province of Tierra del Fuego, and of the department and city of Ushuaia. It has been declared an "Ecological, Historic, and Tourist Provincial Reserve" ("Reserva provincial ecológica, histórica y turística"), with access limited to tours from Ushuaia.

The only settlement is the Puerto Parry Naval Station, located in a deep and narrow fjord on the northern coast of the island. The naval station, established in 1978, is manned by a team of four marines on a 45-day rotation. They monitor environmental conservation and ship movements, and provide emergency assistance.

History
Prior to European arrival, the island was visited by the Yamana people, who inhabited the islands south of Isla Grande de Tierra del Fuego.

The first European to encounter the island was the Spanish naval captain Francisco de Hoces, when in 1526 the ship San Lesmes, from the Spanish expedition of Loaísa, separated from the rest in a storm, being displaced to the south parallel 55, becoming the discoverer of the great island east of Tierra del Fuego, which would later be called the Island of the States or Staten Island.

Almost a century after the Spaniards, the Dutch explorers Jacob le Maire and Willem Schouten passed the island on 25 December 1615, naming it Staten Landt. Le Maire and Schouten sailed their ship, Eendracht, through a route south of the Straits of Magellan, a route now called the Le Maire Strait. To his left Le Maire noted the land mass which he called Staten Landt; he theorized it was perhaps a portion of the great 'Southern Continent.' (The first European name for New Zealand was Staten Landt, the name given to it by the Dutch explorer Abel Tasman, who in 1642 became the first European to see the islands. Tasman also assumed it was part of the 'Southern Continent' later known as Antarctica.)

The Dutch expedition to Valdivia of 1643 intended to sail through Le Maire Strait but strong winds made it instead drift south and east. The small fleet led by Hendrik Brouwer managed to enter the Pacific Ocean sailing south of the island disproving earlier beliefs that it was part of Terra Australis.

No Europeans are known to have settled on the island for more than 200 years. In 1862 Argentine pilot Luis Piedrabuena established a shelter near Port Cook, and built a small seal oil extraction facility on the island.

On New Year's Day, 1775, Captain James Cook named what is now "Puerto Año Nuevo", "New Years Port". Seal hunters established a short-lived factory there (1786-1787), but abandoned it after Duke of York wrecked there on 11 September 1787 while bringing supplies.

The island is also referenced in Richard Henry Dana Jr.'s book Two Years Before the Mast as the first land they see after leaving San Diego. He describes the land as ". . . bare, broken, and girt with rocks and ice, with here and there, between rocks and broken hillocks, a little stunted vegetation of shrubs. . ."

More than twenty years later, the San Juan del Salvamento Lighthouse was inaugurated on May 25, 1884, by Comodoro Augusto Lasserre. It operated until September 1900. The lighthouse, better known as Faro del fin del mundo ("Lighthouse at the end of the world"), is said to have inspired Jules Verne's novel The Lighthouse at the End of the World (1905). A military prison was based on the island from 1896 to 1902. It had to be moved to Tierra del Fuego after being compromised by the strong winds.

Geography
The island is deeply indented by bays.

At the eastern end of the island is Cape St John, a landmark for ships sailing around the island in order to avoid the currents and tides of the Le Maire Strait to the west.

Geology
The island is mainly composed of the Jurassic Lemaire Formation, composed of tuffs and lavas.  The Islas Año Nuevo, Isla Observatoria, and the Caleta Lacroix region on the west coast, however, have exposures of the Jurassic-Cretaceous Beauvoir Formation, mainly composed of shales, mudstones, limestones, and graywacke, plus silt, clay, sand and gravel glacial fluvial deposits.  There are at least 18 fjords, with associated glacial sediments such as moraines and till, especially prevalent at Cape San Antonio and Cape Colnett on the north coast.  Key fjords on the north coast include Port Hoppner, Port Parry, Port Basil Hall, Port Año Nuevo, Port Cook, and Port San Juan Del Salvamento going east to west.  Key fjords on the south coast include Bahía Capitan Cánepa, Port Lobo, Port Vancouver, and Bahía Blossom, going east to west.  Cape Kempe on the south coast lies opposite Cape San Antonio.

Climate
The island has a cold and humid climate and is characterized by rapid and unpredictable changes in the weather from day to day. Under the Köppen climate classification, despite the vegetation, it would be classified as a mild tundra climate (ET), a cold climate with a mean temperature in the warmest month below  with abundant precipitation year-round.

The climate of the island is strongly influenced by the subpolar low pressure system which develops around the Antarctic Circle and the surrounding oceans. Being located between the semi–permanent high pressure cell and the subpolar low (which does not change in intensity through the year and have little seasonal variation), the island is exposed to westerlies throughout the year.

Temperatures are low year round but without extreme minimum temperatures. Mean temperatures are lower than in Tierra del Fuego but due to the moderating influence of the ocean, extreme minimum temperatures are higher than in Tierra del Fuego. Coastal areas have average temperatures above  in the coldest month while higher altitude locations may average below .

However, owing to its relief, precipitation is highly variable across the island. In the eastern parts of the island, it averages  based on 4 years of data. Precipitation occurs frequently on the island, averaging 252 days with precipitation. June is the wettest month while October is the driest. Thunderstorms are very rare. Snow frequently falls during the winter months, averaging 33 days although snow can fall during Autumn and Spring. The island receives high cloud cover throughout the year, with 74% of the days being cloudy. June is the cloudiest month while October is the least cloudy month. Fog is uncommon, averaging only 16 days per year. Similar to the rest of Patagonia, the island is exposed to strong westerly winds. These winds often carry moisture with them, leading to frequent storms.

Flora and fauna
Isla de los Estados is covered with dense low forests of Nothofagus southern beech. The animal life is composed mainly of penguins, orcas, seals, seagulls and cormorants, as well as the human-introduced deer and goats. The island is the location of one of the more southerly Atlantic breeding colonies of the Magellanic penguin. As early as the last part of the 18th century, Isla de los Estados was used as a seal harvesting location.

See also
 Lists of islands

References

Books

External links

 History and geography of the island
 Isla de los Estados - InterPatagonia.com

Geography of Tierra del Fuego Province, Argentina
Estados
Landforms of Tierra del Fuego Province, Argentina
Jules Verne
Islands of Tierra del Fuego